The Annie Award for Animated Effects in an Animated Production is an Annie Award given annually to the best animated effects in animation feature productions. It was first presented at the 25th Annie Awards.

From 2011 to 2016, the category Outstanding Achievement for Animated Effects in a Live Action Production was presented to reward only the animated effects for live-action productions.

Winners and nominees
± = live-action production

1990s
 Best Individual Achievement for Effects Animation

2000s
 Best Individual Achievement for Effects Animation

 Outstanding Achievement for Animated Effects

2010s
 Outstanding Achievement for Animated Effects in an Animated Production

 Outstanding Achievement for Animated Effects in a Live Action Production

2020s
 Best FX - Feature

References

External links 
 Annie Awards: Legacy

Annie Awards
Film awards for Best Visual Effects